Jeanne M. Cochran is an American attorney and jurist serving as a judge of the Minnesota Court of Appeals. She was appointed in 2018 by Governor Mark Dayton and won election to a full term in 2020.

Education 
Cochran earned a Bachelor of Arts degree from Dartmouth College and a Juris Doctor from the University of Minnesota Law School.

Career 
From 1992 to 1994, Cochran worked as an associate attorney for the Sierra Club Legal Defense Fund. From 1994 to 1996, she was an associate at Leonard, Street & Deinard in Minneapolis. From 1998 to 2000, Cochran served as a legislative analyst and attorney for the Minnesota House of Representatives Research Department. From 2000 to 2012, she served as an assistant attorney general in the Minnesota Attorney General's Office, specializing in civil litigation. Cochran served as an administrative law judge of the Minnesota Office of Administrative Hearings. She was appointed to the Minnesota Court of Appeals in 2018, succeeding Randolph W. Peterson.

References 

Living people
Minnesota lawyers
Dartmouth College alumni
University of Minnesota Law School alumni
Sierra Club people
Minnesota Court of Appeals judges
Year of birth missing (living people)